The Great Lakes Intercollegiate Athletic Conference (GLIAC) men's basketball tournament is the annual conference basketball championship tournament for the Great Lakes Intercollegiate Athletic Conference. The tournament has been held annually since 1991. It is a single-elimination tournament and seeding is based on regular season records.

The winner, declared conference champion, receives the GLIAC's automatic bid to the NCAA Men's Division II Basketball Championship.

Results

+Indicates won NCAA championship

Championship records

Parkside, Purdue Northwest, and Saginaw Valley State have not yet reached the finals of the GLIAC tournament.
Lake Erie, Malone, Mercyhurst, Ohio Dominican, Tiffin, and Westminster (PA) never reached the tournament championship game before departing the GLIAC.
 Schools highlighted in pink are former members of the Great Lakes Intercollegiate Athletic Conference

See also
GLIAC women's basketball tournament

References

NCAA Division II men's basketball conference tournaments
Basketball Tournament, Men's
Recurring sporting events established in 1991